The Wellington Sevens is played annually as part of the IRB Sevens World Series for international rugby sevens (seven-a-side version of rugby union).  The 2011 competition was held on February 4 and February 5 at Westpac Stadium.
It was the third of eight events in the 2010–11 IRB Sevens World Series.

Format
The tournament consisted of four round-robin pools of four teams. All sixteen teams progressed to the knockout stage. The top two teams from each group progressed to quarter-finals in the main competition, with the winners of those quarter-finals competing in cup semi-finals and the losers competing in plate semi-finals. The bottom two teams from each group progressed to quarter-finals in the consolation competition, with the winners of those quarter-finals competing in bowl semi-finals and the losers competing in shield semi-finals.

Teams
These 16 teams were invited to participate in the 2010 tournament:

Pool stages

Pool A

Pool B

Pool C

Pool D

Knockout

Shield

Bowl

Plate

Cup

References

External links
 IRB Sevens
 

Wellington Sevens
Wellington Sevens
2011